Tom Baum (born 1940 in New York) is an American playwright, screenwriter, novelist, and short-story writer.  A graduate of Harvard, where he majored in math, he's best known for writing The Sender and Carny, both of which he wrote directly (as Thomas Baum) for the screen. He lives in Los Angeles with his producer wife, Carol Baum. He has two sons, Will Baum and Henry Baum, and three grandchildren.

Awards and nominations
Baum has been nominated for several cable awards as a writer and director on The Hitchhiker (HBO)
Writers Guild Best TV Movie award for Witness to the Execution
Writers Guild Paul Selvin award for Witness to the Execution
Won L.A.'s Eclectic Theatre Company Hurricane Season One-Act Festival for "The Out of Body Treatment for Marital Dysfunction"
Out of the Box Award in a St. Croix, Wisconsin, Festival Theatre Festival
Best Production in N.Y.'s End Time Theatre festival for "Epicenter"
People Magazine's "Beach Book of the Week" for "Out of Body"

Movie Credits
Journey to the Center of the Earth (2008)
Die with Me (2001) 
Dark Prince: The True Story of Dracula (2000)
Journey to the Center of the Earth (TV miniseries) (1999)
Shattered Mind (TV Movie)(1996)
Kidnapped: In the Line of Duty (TV Movie) (1995)
Witness to the Execution (TV Movie)(1994)
Nightmare Cafe (4 episodes, 1992)
- "Aliens Ate My Lunch" (1992) 
- "Sanctuary for a Child" (1992)
- "The Heart of the Mystery" (1992)
- "Dying Well Is the Best Revenge" (1992)
Night Visions (TV Movie)(1990)
War of the Worlds (TV series) (story - 1 episode)
No Direction Home (1989)
The Haunting of Sarah Hardy (TV Movie 1989)
The Hitchhiker (TV Series) (written by - 3 episodes, 1987) (teleplay - 3 episodes, 1985 - 1986) (story - 1 episode, 1986)
- "Made for Each Other" (1987)
- "Doctor's Orders" (1987)
- "Minuteman" (1987)
- "The Curse" (1986)
- "Ghostwriter" (1986)
- "WGOD" (1986)
The Manhattan Project (1986)
Secret Weapons (TV Movie) (1985)
The Sender (1982)
Carny (1980)
Simon (1980)
ABC Afterschool Specials (TV Series) (screenplay - 1 episode, 1977) (screenwriter - 1 episode, 1976) (writer - 1 episode, 1976)
- "The Horrible Honchos" (1977)
- "P.J. and the President's Son" (1976)
- "The Amazing Cosmic Awareness of Duffy Moon" (1976)

Books
 Hugo the Hippo 
 It Looks Alive To Me! 
 Out Of Body 
 The Sender 
 We Remember Everything 
 Counterparts (Dial Press,1970)

Short Stories
 Lost and Found (Playboy. Best SF 1974)
 Backward, Turn Backward (Playboy. Best Short Stories 1972)
 On Location (Playboy)
 The Big Pieces (Playboy)
 The Farabi Connection (Playgirl)
 The Rebirth of Yost (Playboy)
 A Friend in Need (Transatlantic Review)

Short films
Co-directed with Dennis Lo
 Kansas City Gork Come Dance With Me The Catman's Primal SceneProduced PlaysWonk LoveThe Great OutdoorsAshley Saves the WorldTaps for PapsSchadenFridayThe Out of Body Treatment for Marital DysfunctionDon't Empty the Frog (We Are Not Alone)Human ServicesFront Door OpenEpicenterEndangered SpeciesDork LoveBreachShock TherapyToby 24/7 Gets LuckyFree PassFrenemiesLast One UnderKalifa Reports for TreatmentSperm''

Miscellaneous
Tom Baum was a columnist for Filmmaking Review, and columnist and puzzlemaster for the Innuendo, a Los Angeles free paper.  He taught screenwriting at UCLA and USC.

See also
List of playwrights
List of American writers

References

External links
Tom Baum on Filmmaking Review

1940 births
Living people
American television writers
American male television writers
Harvard College alumni
University of Southern California faculty
University of California, Los Angeles faculty